Abu Nasr may refer to:
 Al-Farabi or Abu Nasr, Islamic philosopher
 Abu Nasr (Iran)
 Abu Nasr Palace

People with the name
 Abu Nasr al-Tunisi, Tunisian terrorist
 Abu Nasr Abdul Kahhar, sultan
 Abu Nasr Ahmad ibn Fadl
 Abu Nasr Khusrau Firuz or Al-Malik al-Rahim
 Abu Nasr Mansur, Muslim mathematician
 Abu Nasr Muhammad
 Abu Nasr Mushkan
 Abu Nasr Sa'd of Granada
 Abu Nasr Shams al-Muluk Duqaq, Seljuk ruler of Damascus
 Baha ud-Dawla Abu Nasr Fairuz or Baha' al-Dawla
 Mu'ayyad fi'l-Din al-Shirazi or Hibatullah ibn Musa Abu Nasr al-Mu'ayyad fi d-Din ash-Shirazi
 Khwaja Abu Nasr Parsa

See also 
Abu'l-Nasr
Abu Naser, cricketer
Qara Yusuf

Arabic masculine given names